Finch West is a subway station on the Line 1 Yonge–University of the Toronto subway. It is located under Keele Street, north of Finch Avenue West. When Line 6 Finch West opens in 2023, it will serve as the eastern terminus of that line.

Description
  
The station is underground and parallel to Keele Street just north of Finch Avenue West. Nearby landmarks include Fountainhead Park. Industrial areas lie to the east, James Cardinal McGuigan Catholic High School to the west and York University is to the northwest, served by the next station north on the line.

The main entrance is located on the east side of Keele Street with the secondary entrance on the west side. The main structure has a striped, bar-code cladding to decorate its exterior along with colourful tiling and windows. An elevated substation facility is on the second floor of the main building and overhangs the main entrance as a canopy. The main entrance is highlighted by a glowing panel attached to the canopy. There is a cool roof over this entrance and a green roof over the elevated substation box. The 6-bay bus terminal has an enclosed concourse. Bicycle parking at the station includes 100 secure plus 13 short-term spaces. North of the station is a parking lot for 347 cars plus a pick-up-and-drop-off facility.
 
The station was designed by a consortium of architects and engineers, Spadina Group Associatesincluding All Design (headed by British architect Will Alsop) and IBI Group. Scottish artist Bruce McLeana frequent collaborator with Will Alsopworked with the design team to integrate sculptural concrete forms with the supporting columns within the entrance buildings, on double-height platform columns, and under the bus canopy. Landscape design of the station was by Janet Rosenberg & Studio.

History
 In March 2006, The Globe and Mail reported that real estate development companies belonging to the family of Ontario Finance Minister Greg Sorbara owned the properties just south of the intersection of Finch Avenue West and Keele Street, according to land registry documents and corporate records. The article said that these companies would benefit from higher real estate values due to the subway extension. Sorbara was the Liberal Member of Provincial Parliament for Vaughan, and was a major advocate for the Toronto–York Spadina Subway Extension, which includes Finch West station.

On November 27, 2009, the official groundbreaking ceremony was held for the Toronto–York Spadina Subway Extension (TYSSE), and major tunnelling operations started in June 2011. The project, including Finch West station, was initially expected to be completed by the second quarter of 2015 but was delayed to the fourth quarter of 2016; ultimately, the station opened on December 17, 2017.

In mid-2015, the former Toronto Fire Station 141 on the east side of Keele and south side of the hydro corridor was demolished to make way for the bus platform area. A new fire station replaced this building on the opposite side of Keele Street.

This station, along with the five other TYSSE stations, were the first to be opened without fare collectors, although collector booths were installed as per original station plans. It was also among the first eight stations to discontinue sales of legacy TTC fare media (tokens and tickets). Presto vending machines were available at its opening to sell Presto cards and to load funds or monthly passes onto them. On May 3, 2019, this station became one of the first ten stations to sell Presto tickets via Presto vending machines.

Line 6 Finch West 

Line 6 Finch West, expected to open in 2023, will have its eastern terminus at Finch West station. The station will be located  underground with an east–west orientation under Finch Avenue West, passing over the crossover box structure for Line 1 subway trains.

As part of the project, a new two-storey station entrance will be built at the southeast corner of the Keele–Finch intersection, with an underground tunnel to link the new line to the existing Line 1 station. Two skylights will also be built in the median to allow light into the station below. Provision for the Line 6 connection was included as part of the station's design, with knockout panels provided to ease construction.

Subway infrastructure in the vicinity
 The line curves off the Keele Street alignment a short distance to the north and south of the station, veering northwest to York University station and swings broadly at a 90° angle southeast to Downsview Park station. To reverse trains, there is both a crossover at the south end of the station and a storage track to the north. The centre track structure at this station was constructed in a unique manner from ones at other stations, which were built fully using the cut-and-cover method with columns between the tracks. At this station, after the mainline tunnels were bored and the ground excavated for the station structure, the inner sides of the tunnel liners north of the station box were removed, and the centre track tunnel constructed between them, resulting in three fully separate tunnels.

Surface connections

The 36 Finch West bus route splits here to help maintain reliable service in light of the Finch West LRT construction west of this station. The 36 Finch West and 939B Finch Express enter via Tangiers Road. When the subway is closed, buses do not enter the station and bypass Tangiers Road. Buses serving Keele Street do not enter the station but stop on-street, and a transfer is required for connection. The following routes serve the station:

After Line 6 opening
After the opening of Line 6 Finch West, the above bus connections will be replaced by the following routes (proposed ):

References

External links

 published by CityNews Toronto on October 27, 2017

Line 1 Yonge–University stations
Line 6 Finch West stations
Railway stations in Canada opened in 2017
2017 establishments in Ontario